The Tickfaw River  runs  from Amite County in southwest Mississippi to Livingston Parish in southeast Louisiana.  Its mouth opens into Lake Maurepas, which conjoins with Lake Pontchartrain.

The name Tickfaw (Tiak foha) is thought to be derived from the Choctaw phrase meaning "pine rest" or "Rest Among the Pines". More recent analysis however has determined the name to be derived from shortening and alteration of Pawticfaw meaning "place where wild animals have shed their hair".  Alternate/historical names and spellings:

Rio De San Vicente
Rio De Tickfaw
Rio Go Tickfoha
Riviere Ticfoha
Ticfaw River
Tickfah River
Tickfaw Creek

See also
List of rivers of Louisiana
List of rivers of Mississippi

References

External links
USGS Geographic Names Information System - West Branch Tickfaw River
US EPA National Assessment Database
Army Corps of Engineers Map of the Tickfaw River
US Army Corps of Engineers River and Harbor Act Projects - New Orleans District

Rivers of Louisiana
Rivers of Mississippi
Tributaries of Lake Maurepas
Bodies of water of Livingston Parish, Louisiana
Bodies of water of Amite County, Mississippi
Rivers of Tangipahoa Parish, Louisiana
Bodies of water of St. Helena Parish, Louisiana
Mississippi placenames of Native American origin